The Women's 100 metres at the 2008 Summer Olympics took place on August 16 (heats) and 17 (final) at the Beijing National Stadium.

The qualifying standards for the 2008 event were 11.32 s (A standard) and 11.42 s (B standard).

Jamaica dominated the event with athlete Shelly-Ann Fraser-Pryce taking the gold and Sherone Simpson and Kerron Stewart taking the silver. Officially, no bronze medal was awarded as Simpson and Stewart finished with an equal time of 10.98 seconds in the second place.  Taking all three medals, it was a Jamaican sweep.

Records
Prior to this competition, the existing world and Olympic records were as follows:

No new world or Olympic records were set for this event.

Results
All times shown are in seconds.

Heats
Qualification: First 3 in each heat (Q) and the next 10 fastest (q) advance to the quarterfinals.

Quarterfinals

Qualification: First 3 in each heat (Q) and the next 1 fastest (q) advance to the Semifinals.

Semifinals 
Qualification rule: First 4 in each heat (Q) advance to the final.

Semifinal 1

Semifinal 2

Final

References

Athletics at the 2008 Summer Olympics
100 metres at the Olympics
2008 in women's athletics
Women's events at the 2008 Summer Olympics